The Church of St. Joseph is a church in Rome, in Primavalle district via Boccea.

History
It was built in 1970 by architect Ildo Avetta and dedicated to St. Joseph Marello.
The church was erected as a parish June 19, 1961 by decree of the Cardinal Vicar Clemente Micara Quotidianis curis, and entrusted to the Congregation of the Oblates of St. Joseph d'Asti, who are its owners. Since 1991 is the seat of the cardinal's title of "San Giuseppe all'Aurelio".

Description
The facade is divided into three by pilasters in tufa concrete. The entrance is topped by a ceramic depicting St. Joseph and Child with Angels.
The interior has a nave with side aisles. In the apse is a tapestry depicting St. Joseph and Child, completed in 1915, from the Restoration Laboratory of the Vatican Tapestries, where he lay abandoned. The Via Crucis is Vasco Nasorri: the same is a great ceramics (1986), the apse, with the representation of an illuminated manuscript opened. At the main altar a Last Supper by E.Hortis in 1981.

List of Cardinal Protectors
 Georg Sterzinsky 28 June 1991 - 30 June 2011
 Gerald Lacroix 22 February 2014 - present

References

External links
 San Giuseppe 

Titular churches
Rome Q. XXVII Primavalle
Roman Catholic churches completed in 1961
20th-century Roman Catholic church buildings in Italy